This is a list of photographic film formats.

Multiple image 

For roll holder means film for cartridge roll holders, allowing roll film to be used with cameras designed to use glass plates. These were spooled with the emulsion facing outward, rather than inward as in film designed for native roll-film cameras. Types 106 to 114 were for Eastman-Walker rollholders, while types 50 to 54 were for Graflex rollholders.

The primary reason there were so many different negative formats in the early days was that prints were made by contact, without use of an enlarger. The film format would thus be exactly the same as the size of the print—so if you wanted large prints, you would have to use a large camera and corresponding film format.

Roll film cross-reference table 

Before World War II, each film manufacturer used its own system of numbering for the various sizes of rollfilms they made. The following sortable table shows the corresponding numbers. A blank space means that manufacturer did not make film in that size. Two numbers in one box refers to films available with different numbers of exposures, usually 6 and either 10 or 12. Spool length is measured between inner faces of the flanges; several films of the same image size were available on different spools to fit different cameras.

Single image

Instant film

See also
List of photographic films

References

Film and video technology
 
Lists of photography topics